Makar is a term from Scottish literature for a poet.

Makar may also refer to:
Makar (National Poet for Scotland)
Makar (given name), a Slavic male given name
Makar (surname)

Places 
Makar, Iran, a village in Mazandaran Province, Iran
Makar, Nepal, a village in Nepal
Makar Island in the Laptev Sea
Makars' Court in central Edinburgh, Scotland

Ships 
Makar-class survey catamaran
INS Makar (J31), the lead ship of Makar-class catamarans

Other 
Macar, the name of several individuals in Greek mythology

See also
Makara (disambiguation)
Makarovsky (disambiguation)